As of March 28, 2013, Fraser Milner Casgrain combined with Salans and SNR Denton to form Dentons.

Fraser Milner Casgrain LLP (FMC) was a Canadian business, litigation and tax law firm.  With more than 560 lawyers (175 litigators) it was the sixth largest law firm in Canada as well as the largest law firm in Western Canada. Until 1984, FMC was a fully integrated national partnership with offices in Montreal, Ottawa, Toronto, Edmonton, Calgary, and Vancouver. In 1985, Fraser Milner Casgrain (then known as Fraser and Beatty) underwent a major administration change. Terrence Young was appointed as chief executive officer and he initiated FMC's expansion into Hong Kong, making FMC a multi-national law firm. Young served as CEO for 13 years, until the 1998 merger between Fraser and Beatty and Alberta-based law firm Milner Fenerty. On November 8, 2012, it was announced that FMC would combine with international law firms SNR Denton and Salans to form Dentons. FMC’s most recent CEO before its second merge was Michel Brunet. He was appointed to the role of CEO in 2006 and previously served as Managing Partner of the FMC Montreal office.

History
For more than 170 years, Fraser Milner Casgrain LLP (FMC) grew organically and through mergers, the most notable being the 1998 merger between Fraser & Beatty (a Bay Street firm) and Milner Fenerty, to form Fraser Milner and its subsequent merger with Montreal-based Byers Casgrain in 2000 to form Fraser Milner Casgrain. The following list of dates can be found on FMC's website:

1839 — 	John Willoughby Crawford opens his law office in Toronto, the earliest predecessor of Fraser & Beatty.
1916 —	George Hobson Steer joins the Edmonton law firm of Rutherford, Jamieson & Grant, a predecessor of Milner Fenerty, and the firm is renamed Rutherford, Jamieson, Grant & Steer.
1920 —	Crombie, Worrell & Gwynne, Barristers, Solicitors, Notaries, a predecessor of Fraser & Beatty, becomes Worrell, Gwynne & Beatty, Barristers, Solicitors, Notaries.
1921 —	Hyndman, Milner & Matheson, a predecessor  of Milner Fenerty, becomes Hyndman, Milner, Matheson, Carr & Dafoe.
1945 —	Milner, Steer, Poirier, Martland & Bowker, a predecessor of Milner Fenerty, becomes Milner, Steer, Dyde, Poirier, Martland & Bowker.
1980 —	J. Donald Mawhinney, Q.C. and Howard J. Kellough, Q.C. establish Mawhinney & Kellough in Vancouver.
1985 —	 Terrence Young is appointed as CEO and he expands FMC's offices into Hong Kong.
1989 —	The Supreme Court of Canada rules that national law firms are allowed to do business in Canada, a ruling that would set the stage for the union of Fraser & Beatty with Mawhinney & Kellough, and later with Milner Fenerty and Byers Casgrain. The case was one of the earliest to deal with the Charter of Rights and Freedoms.
1990 —	Fraser & Beatty, Barristers & Solicitors, with offices in Toronto and Ottawa, merges with Mawhinney & Kellough in Vancouver under the name Fraser & Beatty. When Fraser & Beatty merged with Mawhinney & Kellough, it was one of the first law firm mergers in Canada after the 1989 ruling.
1991 —	Milner Steer joins Fenerty Robertson, becomes Milner Fenerty.
1998 —	Fraser & Beatty and Alberta-based Milner Fenerty, becomes Fraser Milner.
2000 —	On June 6, Fraser Milner, with offices in Calgary, Edmonton, Toronto, Ottawa and Vancouver, merges with Byers Casgrain in Montréal to form Fraser Milner Casgrain.
2013 —	On March 28, Fraser Milner Casgrain merges with  SNR Denton and Salans to form Dentons.

References

External links
 Fraser Milner Casgrain LLP (FMC) Website
 Fraser Milner Casgrain S.E.N.C.R.L. (FMC) French Website

Defunct law firms of Canada
Law firms established in 1839
2013 disestablishments in Canada
Law firms disestablished in 2013
Canadian companies established in 1839